Mooncussers is a 1962 American TV film from Disney. It was originally released on TV in two parts but was released in some markets as a theatrical film, occasionally shown as part of a double bill with another Disney film.

It was based on the novel Flying Ebony by Iris Vinton.

Plot
Pirates lure ships to destruction along the New England coast of the United States of America.

Cast
Kevin Corcoran as Jonathan Feather
Oscar Homolka as Urias Hawke 
Lee Aaker as Willy
Paul E. Burns as Mose 
Robert Burton as E.P. Hallett
Robert Emhardt as Mr. Wick
Joan Freeman as Betsy Feather
Rian Garrick as Dan Hallett
Ted Jacques as Bill Stacy
Dayton Lummis as Commissioner
Erin O'Brien-Moore as Mrs. Feather
Tudor Owen as Skipper of Portland
Dub Taylor as Fire Tender
Eddy Waller as Captain Swain

Production
Filming started April 16, 1962.

References

External links
Mooncussers at IMDb
Graveyard of Ships at IMDb
Wake of Disaster at IMDb
Mooncussers at BFI

1962 films
American television films
American crime films
American adventure films
American biographical films
1960s American films